Henry Burton Brough (27 December 1896 – 1975) was an English footballer who played in the Football League for Huddersfield Town and Stoke.

Career
Brough was born in Gainsborough, Lincolnshire and began his career with Huddersfield Town in 1913. His career at Huddersfield was hampered by World War I but once the league had resumed he helped the "Town" finish 2nd in 1919–20 gaining promotion to the First Division. Herbert Chapman came in as manager and Brough lost his place in the side being used as a backup player. In February 1923 he joined Stoke City after he had an unsuccessful trial with Manchester United.

He was a regular in the Stoke side in 1923–24 and 1924–25 and scored once against Coventry City in September 1924. After making 85 appearances for Stoke he retired in October 1925.

Career statistics
Source:

Honours
 Huddersfield Town
 Football League Second Division runner-up: 1919–20

References

1896 births
1975 deaths
English footballers
Association football midfielders
English Football League players
Huddersfield Town A.F.C. players
Stoke City F.C. players